The 1902 Coronation Honours were awarded in honour of the coronation of Edward VII.

Most Distinguished Order of St Michael and St George

Companion of the Order of St Michael and St George (CMG)
 Frederic Dudley North, Esq., Clerk of the Executive Council and Under Secretary in the Premier's Department of the State of Western Australia.

References

1902 awards
Orders, decorations, and medals of Australia